Alcabideche is a parish located in the Portuguese municipality of Cascais. The population in 2011 was 42,162, in an area of 39.77 km².

References

External links
Official website